The British Rail Class 90 electric locomotives were built for mixed-traffic duties, operating from  overhead lines and producing .

The Class 90 is a modernised derivative of the preceding Class 87 locomotive, having been originally designated as the Class 87/2. During the 1980s, British Rail Engineering Limited (BREL) had submitted an offer to build 25 examples to replace various aging electric locomotives, including the Class 81, Class 82, Class 83, Class 84 and Class 85. It was selected over numerous rival proposals, including the InterCity 225 and the Class 89; the type was manufactured by BREL at Crewe Works between 1987 and 1990.

The Class 90 was introduced to service during the closing years of British Rail, being used for both passenger services and freight trains alike. Following the privatisation of British Rail, the type has served with various operators, including Greater Anglia, Virgin Trains and Great North Eastern Railway (GNER); it was, however, displaced largely from regular passenger services during the 2000s and 2010s. Presently, Class 90 locomotives are usually employed on heavy freight trains and occasional charter services.

History
The origins of the Class 90 can be traced back to various schemes performed by British Rail (BR) during the 1970s and 1980s. Several events, including the electrification of the East Coast Main Line (ECML) and the cancelled procurement of the Advanced Passenger Train (APT), which was at one point intended for the APT to be the next major inter-city express train, had led to a significant nationwide shortage of electric traction. Various different efforts were launched during this era to alleviate this shortage, including an electrified version of the InterCity 125 (known as the HST-E), the  mixed-traffic locomotive, and what would become the InterCity 225.

While BR's board had approved the ordering of a single Class 89 for demonstration purposes, the Strategy Committee queried why the locomotive had been favoured over a proposed 80-tonne Bo-Bo locomotive. At this time, the Class 89 had been allegedly thought to be a low-risk option for multi-purpose operations, but offered little in the way of performance advantages over the existing . It was clear that additional electric locomotives were necessary no matter what, as both the 1950s era  and  electric locomotives were nearing the end of their viable service lives and had become quite unreliable. The InterCity 225 was, at one point, intended to address this need for multipurpose traction; the prequalification document included a requirement for it to perform mixed-traffic duties, including day and night passenger duties, as well as handling parcel/mail traffic and overnight heavy freight services. Appraisals had also determined that the Class 89 was comparatively inferior in financial terms to the InterCity 225, which decreased the likelihood of the former ever attaining quantity production.

While it was intended for the InterCity 225 to be ubiquitous, even potentially having the capability built into it to operate over the southern third-rail network and within the Channel Tunnel, such fanciful ideas had been curtailed by mid 1984. BR officials opted to deprioritise the freight haulage capabilities of the InterCity 225; instead, they planned to meet the outstanding traction needs for the sector via other platforms. The  locomotive, having been introduced a decade earlier, had proven itself capable; thus there was considerable interest procuring additional units as a low-cost option with virtually no risk for the West Coast Main Line (WCML). The British Rail Engineering Limited (BREL) issued its submission to produce an initial batch of 25 Class 87/2s (the original designation for the Class 90), which quickly received a favourable reception.

The BR board decided that it would curtail its plans to procure the InterCity 225 for the WCML and instead procure the Class 87/2 to haul its intended traffic. As result of this procurement, the freight business refused to finance a planned upgrade to InterCity 225’s traction equipment, which would have given the former an equal haulage capability to the Class 87/2. Further studies determined that, when hauling passenger consists, the Class 87/2 had no disadvantage against the InterCity 225 on the WCML, unless the latter was outfitted with tilting coaches; both the Class 87/2 and the InterCity 225's  locomotive had been specified to possess at least . Accordingly, the procurement of the Class 90 was assured, while no InterCity 225s would be procured for the WCML.

A total of 50 Class 90 locomotives were manufactured by BREL at the Crewe Works from 1985 to 1990; these were numbered 90001-050.

Description

The design of the Class 90 is heavily derived from the Class 87, but incorporates many improvements and new features; due to this lineage, the type was initially classified as the Class 87/2 prior to introduction. However, on account of its many visual and technical differences, it was decided to reclassify the locomotive as its own TOPS class. The Class 90s were primarily built to replace the Class 81-85 locomotives, all of which dated from the early 1960s and had become quite unreliable due to their advanced ages.

The class is fitted with rheostatic brakes in addition to standard Westinghouse air brake equipment. A Time-Division Multiplexer (TDM) is fitted to enable two or more locomotives to work in multiple or to work a push-pull passenger train with a Driving Van Trailer (DVT), DBSO or Propelling Control Vehicle. Single phase 1,000V electric train supply (ETS) is provided to facilitate passenger working.

In 1991, with the sectorisation of British Rail removing shared mixed traffic locomotives and limiting them to specific sectors, 25 locomotives were dedicated for freight traffic; they were reclassified Class 90/1 and renumbered 90126-150 by the addition of 100 to the original number, with a 26th (90125) converted in 1993. Many of these locomotives were repainted in the new Railfreight Distribution two-tone grey livery, which was replaced by a revised version in 1994. Three locomotives (90128, 90129 and 90130) received special continental liveries: (NMBS/SNCB blue, Deutsche Bahn red and SNCF grey respectively) to celebrate the Freightconnection event in 1992.

In October 1991, the BR Parcels sector rebranded itself as Rail Express Systems introducing a new livery and dedicated to Royal Mail parcels services as well as postal trains. They were primarily used on London-Glasgow, London-Newcastle and Birmingham-Glasgow services. Five locomotives, 90016-020, were repainted into the new livery between October 1991 and March 1992.

Of the remaining locomotives, the first 15 (90001-015) were operated by InterCity West Coast on express passenger services and 90021-025 were operated by Railfreight Distribution; the latter group remained as standard Class 90/0 locomotives to enable them to operate charter trains or be used on standard passenger trains.
Due to the Class 91s' initial unreliability, Railfreight Distribution leased some of their 90/0s to InterCity for use on the East Coast Main Line with Mark 4 coaches. These services were usually limited to London Kings Cross to Leeds/York services, due to their lower  top speed.

Many Class 90 locomotives have received names. The passenger locomotives were named after cities, newspapers or famous institutions; many of the freight locomotives have been given names with a commercial link. The Class 90 was the first new locomotive to carry InterCity Swallow livery.

Current operators
Upon the privatisation of British Rail in 1996, the Class 90 fleet was divided between several operators:

DB Cargo UK

English Welsh & Scottish acquired the largest fleet: 20 locomotives from Railfreight Distribution and five from Rail Express Systems.

DB Cargo UK Class 90s were planned to be hired to Grand Central to haul Mark 4 carriages on its London Euston to Blackpool North services; however, these services were permanently abandoned on 10 September 2020.

Freightliner
Freightliner inherited 10 Class 90/1 locos, numbered 90141-50 and all leased from Porterbrook. These have since been returned to their original Class 90/0 configuration. Freightliner additionally acquired 90016 which was provided by EWS as a replacement for 90050, which was withdrawn in 2004 following fire damage while on lease to EWS. 90050, which is stored at Crewe Basford Hall, is used as a donor vehicle for spare parts for its other Class 90 locomotives.

During 2019, Freightliner purchased 13 Class 90 locomotives from Porterbrook Leasing formerly operated by Greater Anglia. Upon transfer of the fleet in May 2020, the locos underwent a modification programme to match the freight Class 90 specification. Upon completion of these modifications, the class is expected to replace Freightliner's Class 86 locomotives, which date back to the mid-1960s. In July 2020, 90014 was painted by Toton TMD and given the name Over the Rainbow.

Locomotive Services Limited
Following withdrawal by Greater Anglia in 2020, 90001 and 90002 were acquired by Locomotive Services Limited (LSL) operate their excursion trains alongside their Class 86 and Class 87. Their use varies between working electrically operated excursions along the West Coast Main Line between London and Glasgow, using an identically painted set of coaches or working part of a tour which would be operated by modern traction before being worked by a steam locomotive. After purchase by LSL, the two locomotives were repainted into their original InterCity Swallow livery; 90001 was named Royal Scot and 90002 Wolf of Badenoch.

Former operators

Caledonian Sleeper

Virgin Trains contracted  were replaced by English, Welsh and Scottish Railway (EWS) Class 90s in March 1998. An agreement was reached in 2006 to paint a number of Class 90s into First ScotRail colours, for exclusive use hauling the Caledonian Sleeper. In 2015, with Serco taking over the Caledonian Sleeper franchise, the haulage contract went to GB Railfreight, who chose to use Class 92s on the West Coast Main Line. However, due to mechanical problems, a Class 90 locomotive was used. This was initially hired from DB Cargo UK, but later changed to Freightliner. Operation ended in October 2019.

East Coast Main Line
In the late 1990s, GNER hired Class 90s to stand in for Class 91s on London Kings Cross and Leeds services. 90024 was repainted in GNER livery. In 2016, DB Cargo Class 90s were returned to the East Coast Main Line on Virgin Trains East Coast London to Newark North Gate, Leeds and Newcastle services, whilst the Class 91 locomotives were overhauled. These continued to be operated by London North Eastern Railway until 9 June 2019.

Greater Anglia

As part of the National Express East Anglia franchise bid, National Express provided a fleet plan to replace the ageing Class 86 locomotives on the Great Eastern Main Line with the more powerful and newer Class 90 locomotives, hoping this would improve performance and reduce operating cost. The Class 90s were to become available due to Virgin Trains' plan to replace all loco hauled passenger trains with Class 390 Pendolino units, freeing up their 15 class 90 locomotives. 90001 - 90015 were progressively delivered to Crown Point TMD to replace the Class 86s. These locomotives had their original louvered horn covers replaced with a single plate design with V-patterned holes, matching the Mark 3 DVTs.

The National Express franchise came to an end in February 2012, with the replacement franchisee Greater Anglia taking over and continuing to operate the locomotive.

In January 2020, the Class 745 FLIRT sets began entering service to replace the Class 90 sets. Following the introduction of these units, the loco-hauled sets have all been withdrawn from service, with the last set running its last services on 24 March 2020. Thirteen moved to Freightliner to replace the class 86s, while the other two went to Locomotive Services Limited.

Virgin Trains
Virgin Trains inherited 15 locomotives at privatisation, 90001-015, to work passenger trains on the West Coast Main Line (WCML).

In 1998, 90002 became the first locomotive to be repainted in Virgin Trains' red and black livery. It was named Mission: Impossible to launch the challenge of upgrading passenger services on the WCML. The rest of the fleet was quickly repainted into the new livery.

In 2002, Class 390 Pendolino electric multiple units started to enter service to replace locomotive-hauled trains on the WCML. The first locomotives to be replaced were the elderly Class 86/2s and some of the less reliable Class 87 locomotives. However, since the Class 90 fleet was relatively small and subsequently non-standard, it was decided to retain the larger Class 87 fleet in preference to the Class 90s. Therefore, from March 2004, Virgin started to return its Class 90 fleet to the ROSCO, allowing the locos to transfer to the new 'one' (later National Express East Anglia) franchise.

Following the derailment and subsequent scrapping of 390033 at Grayrigg in 2007, Virgin Trains had the need for an additional set as a stop gap before another Pendolino set was built. As a result, Virgin used Class 90 locomotives hired from DB Schenker, and later Freightliner, along with a rake of Mark 3 coaching stock and a DVT. Nicknamed the Pretendolino, this received re-upholstered seating, power points, wi-fi and a full external re-paint at Wabtec, Doncaster in 2009. Virgin used this set with a Class 90 locomotive hired from Freightliner on a Euston to Crewe (via Birmingham) Friday relief service until December 2012 and also hired the train out as a charter train. It was sometimes used on London - Birmingham services in the event of a Pendolino shortage.

From the December 2013 timetable change, Virgin Trains used the Mark 3 set once again on London - Birmingham services on a Thursday and Friday only basis, Class 90s leased from Direct Rail Services, which were sub-leased from DB Schenker, were used once again.

Fleet

Summary

Fleet list

Model railways
In 1988, Hornby Railways launched its first version of the BR Class 90 in OO gauge. Since 2017, Hornby have produced a basic representation of the prototype as part of their Railroad range in BR Intercity Swallow Livery, whilst past examples have carried a variety of liveries.

In 2019 Bachmann Branchline launched their BR Class 90 in OO gauge.

Gallery

References

Citations

Sources

 .
 .

Further reading
 .
 .

External links

Bo-Bo locomotives
BREL locomotives
90
25 kV AC locomotives
Railway locomotives introduced in 1987
Standard gauge locomotives of Great Britain